Hassen Béjaoui (born 14 February 1975) is a Tunisian former football goalkeeper.

Career 
Bejaoui played for a few clubs, including CA Bizertin, Stade Tunisien and CS Sfaxien. He last played for CA Bizertin and participates in the Arab Champions' League.

International 
Bejaoui played for the Tunisia national football team and was a participant at the 2002 FIFA World Cup. He also was part of the squad at the 2002 African Cup of Nations.

References

External links

1975 births
2002 FIFA World Cup players
Association football goalkeepers
Living people
Tunisia international footballers
Tunisian footballers
2002 African Cup of Nations players
CA Bizertin players
People from Bizerte